Romanas Brazdauskis (born February 20, 1964 in Kretinga) is a former basketball player from Lithuania, who won the bronze medal with the Lithuania national basketball team at the 1992 Summer Olympics in Barcelona, Spain. His son, Lukas Brazdauskis, played for BC Lietuvos Rytas.

Career
 1981–1982:  Lietkabelis Panevėžys
 1982–1983:  Statyba Vilnius
 1983–1985:  Rīgas ASK
 1985–1987:  Statyba Vilnius
 1987–1990:  Žalgiris Kaunas
 1991–1992:  Vytis Adelaide
 1993–1994:  Žalgiris Kaunas
 1996–1997:  BK Inter Bratislava
 1997–1998:  Olimpas Plungė
 2000–2001:  Atletas Kaunas
 2009–2010:  Raseiniai

References
 databaseOlympics

1964 births
Living people
ASK Riga players
Lithuanian men's basketball players
Basketball players at the 1992 Summer Olympics
Olympic bronze medalists for Lithuania
Olympic basketball players of Lithuania
BC Statyba players
Olympic medalists in basketball
Medalists at the 1992 Summer Olympics
Sportspeople from Kretinga
BC Lietkabelis players